Somatina ossicolor is a moth of the  family Geometridae. It is found on Sumba.

References

Moths described in 1898
Scopulini